Ditomyia is a genus of fungus gnats in the family Ditomyiidae.

Species
D. carinata Zaitzev, 1980
D. claripennis Saigusa, 1973
D. euzona Loew, 1870
D. fasciata (Meigen, 1818)
D. insularis Zaitzev, 1994
D. klimovae Zaitzev & Menzel, 1996
D. macroptera Winnertz, 1852
D. pilosella Statz, 1944
D. potomaca Fisher, 1941
D. spinifera Zaitzev, 1978

References

Ditomyiidae
Sciaroidea genera